Pietro Acquarone (born 23 January 1917 in Taggia – died 1 May 1993 in Sanremo) was a professional Italian football player.

He played 5 games in the 1940/41 season in the Serie A for A.S. Roma.

External links

1917 births
1993 deaths
Italian footballers
Serie A players
A.S. Roma players
Pisa S.C. players
S.S.D. Sanremese Calcio players
Association football midfielders
Asti Calcio F.C. players